Romania has participated in the biennial classical music competition Eurovision Young Musicians 5 times since its debut in 2002, most recently taking part in 2010 and are yet to receive a top 3 placing in any contest.

Participation overview

See also
Romania in the Eurovision Song Contest
Romania in the Junior Eurovision Song Contest

References

External links 
 Eurovision Young Musicians

Countries in the Eurovision Young Musicians